Mieniplotia is a genus of freshwater snails in the family Thiaridae. It is monotypic, the sole species being Mieniplotia scabra (O. F. Müller, 1774).

Distribution and habitat
Mieniplotia scabra is coastal freshwater species that can also occur in brackish water. It occurs from the east coast of Africa to the south Pacific; it is considered invasive in parts of its range.

Description

References

 Lozouet, P. & Plaziat, J.-C., 2008 - Mangrove environments and molluscs, Abatan river, Bohol and Panglao islands, central Philippines, p. 1-160, 38 pls

Thiaridae
Monotypic gastropod genera
Gastropods of Africa
Gastropods of Asia
Molluscs of Oceania